The 1949 Colorado Buffaloes football team was an American football team that represented the University of Colorado as a member of the Big Seven Conference  during the 1949 college football season. Led by second-year head coach Dallas Ward, the Buffaloes compiled an overall record of 3–7 with a mark of 1–4 in conference play, placing sixth in the Big 7.

Schedule

References

Colorado
Colorado Buffaloes football seasons
Colorado Buffaloes football